Diogo Mateus de Almeida Maciel (born February 13, 1993) is a Brazilian footballer who plays as a right back for Guarani.

Career
Diogo Mateus came through the youth ranks with Internacional. During the 2012–13 seasons, whilst with the Under-23 side, he had a loan spell with Porto B, making his senior debut on 18 August 2012 against União Madeira. He stayed in Portugal with Portimonense, signing a loan deal for the 2013–14 season, however this was not a success, and he played in only one game before returning to Brazil prematurely in December.

In 2014 he was made part of the squad for 2014 Campeonato Brasileiro Série A, and made his top-flight debut against Botafogo on 27 April. In May 2015 he joined Vitória on loan. He became first choice in his position as the team won promotion from 2015 Campeonato Brasileiro Série B. He was unable to agree a deal beyond the end of his loan spell with the club, and signed instead for Ponte Preta in March 2016. However, he could not break into the first team, and by August 2016 he had returned to Vitória, on loan until the end of the season. He returned to Ponte Preta, but was not registered for the 2017 edition of Campeonato Paulista, and in February he signed for Criciúma, with a desire to achieve another promotion from Série B.

In December 2017 he signed for Ferroviária for 2018 Campeonato Paulista. At the end of the campaign he renewed his contract with the club, but was not registered for their Série D campaign, being loaned instead to CRB in April for their 2018 Campeonato Brasileiro Série B campaign. In April 2019, after spending the 2019 Campeonato Paulista campaign with Ferroviária, he signed another loan agreement with Coritiba.

Career statistics

Honours

Club
J1 League: 2020

References

External links
 

1993 births
Living people
Brazilian footballers
Brazilian expatriate footballers
Association football midfielders
Liga Portugal 2 players
Campeonato Brasileiro Série A players
Campeonato Brasileiro Série B players
FC Porto B players
Portimonense S.C. players
Sport Club Internacional players
Esporte Clube Vitória players
Associação Atlética Ponte Preta players
Expatriate footballers in Portugal
Criciúma Esporte Clube players
Associação Ferroviária de Esportes players
Clube de Regatas Brasil players
Coritiba Foot Ball Club players
Kawasaki Frontale players
Brazilian expatriate sportspeople in Portugal
Brazilian expatriate sportspeople in Japan
Expatriate footballers in Japan
Footballers from São Paulo